Rakeen Saad Al-Silawi (born 16 December 1989) is a Jordanian actress.

Personal life 
She is the daughter of the late journalist Saad Al-Silawi, former chief correspondent and regional manager of Al Arabiya News Channel. Her mother is an artist and the jewelry designer of Rawabi Abughazaleh. She is a middle child, between her older brother Sari, and younger sister Razanah.

Career 
She started theatrical performance at 10 years old, when she was a student in the National Center for Culture and Arts at King Hussein Foundation. She received her Bachelor of Arts in Drama from the University of Exeter. She participated in many workshops and acting courses in cinema and TV in Canada and Egypt.

After university, she went back to Amman and had her first acting role on TV in the series Quds Gate  (Bawabet Al Quds) after she was nominated by the producer Albert Haddad, a close family friend.

From there, Rakeen began networking with figures in the production scene, and participated in an awareness campaign for women's rights titled "White Hands Drama."

Her work

Filmography

Theatre

Cinema

Awards 

 Jordan: Queen Rania's Award for Excellence 2006.

References

External links 

 نجوم مسلسل سمرقند موقع إم بي سي

1989 births
People from Amman
Jordanian actresses
Alumni of the University of Exeter
Jordanian television actresses
Jordanian film actresses
Jordanian stage actresses
Living people